In the years from 1726 to 1750, cricket became an established sport in London and the south-eastern counties of England. In 1726, it was already a thriving sport in the south east and, though limited by the constraints of travel at the time, it was slowly gaining adherents in other parts of England, its growth accelerating with references being found in many counties. Having been essentially a rural pastime for well over a century, cricket became a focus for wealthy patrons and gamblers whose interests funded its growth throughout the 18th century.

Patrons such as the 2nd Duke of Richmond sought to ensure order both on and off the field of play. The earliest known written rules were deployed in 1727 and the first code of laws was enacted in 1744. Ground enclosure began in 1731 and, later in the decade, admission fees were introduced. Media interest grew as the newspaper industry developed, a lead being taken by two new publications. London's Artillery Ground became the sport's showcase venue with top-class matches played in front of large crowds. The single wicket form enjoyed huge popularity in the 1740s and reached its zenith in 1748. Leading players of the time included Robert "Long Robin" Colchin of Bromley and Richard Newland of Slindon.

Continuing growth of cricket
Cricket was still a regional sport in England, albeit a very popular one, as the constraints of travel limited its introduction to the rest of the country. There are the earliest mentions of cricket being played in Gloucestershire in 1729, Buckinghamshire in 1730, and Hampshire in 1733. Its focal point in the mid-18th century was the Artillery Ground at Finsbury in London. Around 1730, this succeeded Kennington Common as the preferred home venue of London Cricket Club and became the stage for numerous important matches, including lucrative single wicket contests. While London represented the metropolitan side of cricket, there were several famous rural clubs like Dartford, Chertsey and Croydon which could challenge London and provide the main strength in their respective county teams, Kent and Surrey. Middlesex and Sussex could also put strong teams into the field. Well-known venues of the time included the Artillery Ground, Dartford Brent, Kennington Common, Moulsey Hurst and Richmond Green.

Cricket thrived on the funds provided by patronage, gambling and large, enthusiastic crowds. As its popularity grew, it began to spread outwards from its south-eastern heartland. The game had already reached the Americas and India as confirmed by references to the game being played overseas by English sailors and colonists in the first quarter of the 18th century.

The most prominent patrons in the 1720s were Edwin Stead (Kent), the 2nd Duke of Richmond, Sir William Gage (both Sussex) and Alan Brodrick (Surrey). Gage and Richmond continued to support cricket through the 1730s when additional patrons were the Prince of Wales and Lord John Sackville. Among the few players whose names have been recorded in the 1730s were Thomas Waymark, Tim Coleman and John Bowra. Edwin Stead died on 28 August 1735.

Some matches in the 1720s were arranged at places like Peper Harow and Penshurst Park which have long been horse racing locations; today, they both house point-to-point racecourses. There were strong gambling connections between cricket, racing and prizefighting throughout the 18th century with matches being staged at venues like Moulsey Hurst or, later, the Forest New Ground at Nottingham; and the fact that MCC and the Jockey Club were both founded by the "Noblemen's and Gentlemen's Club" which used to meet socially at the Star & Garter on Pall Mall in London.

Media coverage
No cricket had been reported in the infant newspaper industry before 1697 due to the Licensing of the Press Act 1662 which controlled the press until 1696, but reports were beginning to increase by the mid-1720s, though it would be a very long time indeed before coverage became anything like comprehensive. Early reports tended to be an advertisement for a scheduled match or else a brief discussion of the gambling odds rather than the actual play and it was not until 1726 that players were first mentioned by name in a newspaper report. There was a significant increase in the number of matches reported during the 1730 season with four single wicket contests and several 11-a-side games, many featuring the London Club which was by then well established as the sport's premier club and taking on county opposition from Kent and Surrey. Match reports were much more common in the 1730s and were beginning to present increased detail, sometimes including the names of patrons and players. There is, therefore, a considerably larger record of the 1730s than of the previous decades.

The London Evening Post was founded in 1726 and the Daily Advertiser began publication in 1730. Both carried a good many cricket notices until they ceased publication in 1797 and 1798 respectively. The growth of the newspaper industry was important contemporarily for giving the sport much needed publicity and historically for providing glimpses into a developing sport that had still not learned how to record itself for posterity.

The match between Kent and All England played at the Artillery ground on 18 June 1744 was described in Cricket: An Heroic Poem by James Love. This was the first major piece of writing about cricket.

The Laws of Cricket

Articles of Agreement, 1727
In 1727, the 2nd Duke of Richmond organised two matches against Alan Brodrick and they drew up articles of agreement between them to determine the rules that must apply in these contests. This type of agreement seems to have been used throughout the period. It is the earliest known instance of rules (or some part of the rules as in this case) being formally agreed, although rules as such definitely existed. In early times, the rules would be agreed orally and subject to local variations so the articles of agreement were created to complement and clarify the rules. Another reference to articles of agreement occurs in 1730 when London played Kent at a venue called Frog Lane in Islington. The report says: "but being obliged by their Articles to leave off at seven o'clock", they could not finish it. London had a lead of 30 when play ended and there was a resumption on Kennington Common six days later. The first formalised Laws of Cricket were written in 1744.

The 1727 articles of agreement stated that "the Duke of Richmond & Mr. Brodrick shall determine the Ball or Balls to be played with". Similar rules applied through the period and there was no known attempt to standardise bat or ball size until much later. Batsmen defended a two-stump wicket using a bat shaped like a modern hockey stick against a ball that was bowled all along the ground, either by rolling or skimming. The oldest known surviving cricket bat is dated 1729. It is on display in The Oval pavilion and belonged to one John Chitty of Knaphill, Surrey.

Pads, gloves and other forms of protective equipment were unknown. Umpires carried a stick, believed to be a bat, which the batsmen had to touch to complete a run. Scorers sat on a mound in the field and "notched" runs (then known as notches) on tally sticks. All runs had to be completed in full as boundaries were not recognised and there were no known rules concerning the care and maintenance of the wicket, although the leading bowler on the visiting team had the right to decide where the wickets would be pitched. The only early rule about pitch and wicket dimensions was re the length of the pitch at 23 yards in 1727; this became a chain (22 yards) by 1744.

1744 code

The 1744 Laws were codified by members of the London club but not typeset until 1752 and not published until 1755. Among the provisions were pitch and wicket dimensions, balls per over and the roles and responsibilities of the umpires. Referring to the 1774 Laws, John Major says that regulation had hitherto been "rather informal" and believes that the 1744 rules were only a revision or codification of existing practice. The dimensions of the wicket, two stumps topped by a single bail, were set at 22 inches high and six inches wide.

Single wicket
The London Evening Post dated Saturday, 27 August 1726 carried an advertisement for a single wicket match between players called "the noted Perry" (of London) and "the famous Piper" (of Hampton), playing "for twenty pounds a side". The match was played at Moulsey Hurst, a multi-sport venue near Molesey in Surrey.

This is the first time that players are known to have been named in a newspaper and the match itself is the earliest known to have been played under single wicket rules. Single wicket was a form of top-class cricket that had periods of great popularity in the 18th and 19th centuries, mainly for the opportunities it offered to gamblers. It became increasingly popular during the 1730s, with numerous big money events taking place at the Artillery Ground. This continued through the 1740s and single wicket reached a peak in the 1748 season.

There were four single wicket matches in the 1730 season, three of which involved four-man Kent teams led by Edwin Stead in matches against four of Brentford Cricket Club. The other game was between three of Surrey and three of Sussex. The stake was usually £50. In August 1735, there was a three against four match (result unknown) on Kennington Common, all the players being members of the London club.

The Artillery Ground
A London v Surrey match on 31 August 1730 took place at the Artillery Ground in Bunhill Fields, Finsbury, London. London won by 6 runs. It is the earliest definite match at the venue which was referred to in contemporary reports as the "old" Artillery Ground, but that may be because it was used frequently for other forms of sport or entertainment. It was generally used for matches involving the original London Club and also became the featured venue of all London cricket until the mid-1760s, after which the Hambledon Club increased its influence.

Matches were recorded at the Artillery Ground until as late as 1778 but by then the London Club had disbanded, although its members continued their social and organisational existences and maintained their influence over the game as a whole.

The earliest known instances of ground enclosure occurred in 1731, the playing area on Kennington Common being roped off twice in an attempt to keep spectators off the field. Cricket is the first sport known to have enclosed its venues and it quickly became common practice with stakes and ropes being reported at the Artillery Ground in 1732. It is not clear when admission fees were first introduced but there was certainly a two pence charge in place at the Artillery Ground by the early 1740s.

Schools and universities
In 1727, Horace Walpole commented that cricket was already "common" at Eton College. This is the earliest reference to cricket both at Eton and in the county of Berkshire.

Controversies
Cricket had some brushes with the law in the first half of the century, including two court cases about unpaid gambling debts. The second of these followed a match in 1724 between Stead's XI and a Chingford team on Dartford Brent. Terminating Stead's lawsuit, Lord Chief Justice Pratt ordered the match to be completed in order that the stakes could be settled. The replay took place in September 1726. In a letter written the same month, an Essex resident complained that a local Justice of the Peace had literally "read the Riot Act" to some people who were playing cricket. With reference to Pratt's ruling, the issue raised was that it was apparently lawful to play cricket in Kent but not in Essex.

Gambling was prevalent at cricket matches in Georgian England and many gambling- or alcohol-fuelled incidents occurred. The issue was not addressed by the sport's ruling body until the 1770s and it remained a significant aspect through the 1730s and 1740s. The other side of the coin was the reliance of cricket as a professional sport upon the investment accrued through gambling interests. The importance of gambling was illustrated in 1730 when a match between teams sponsored by Richmond and Gage was cancelled "on account of Waymark, the Duke's man, being ill". Waymark was the outstanding player of the day and stakes would have been laid on his expected performance. Without his involvement, all bets were "off" and so the game was a non-starter.

A controversial match took place on Monday, 23 August 1731, when Thomas Chambers' XI took on the Duke of Richmond's XI (i.e., effectively a Middlesex v. Sussex match) at Richmond Green in a return match played for 200 guineas. It is notable in one sense as the earliest match of which the team scores are known: Richmond's XI 79, Chambers' XI 119; Richmond's XI 72, Chambers' XI 23–5 (approximately). The game ended promptly at a pre-agreed time although Chambers' XI with "four or five more to have come in" and needing "about 8 to 10 notches" clearly had the upper hand. The result caused a fracas among the crowd who were incensed by the prompt finish because the Duke of Richmond had arrived late and delayed the start of the game. The riot resulted in some of the Sussex players "having the shirts torn off their backs; and it was said a law suit would commence about the play". On Wednesday, 8 September, the Daily Post Boy reported that "(on 6 September) 11 of Surrey beat the 11 who about a fortnight ago beat the Duke of Richmond's men". This would suggest that the Duke of Richmond conceded his controversial game against Chambers' XI. Middlesex patron Thomas Chambers was a probable forebear of Lord Frederick Beauclerk.

A dispute arose over scheduled finishing time in the London v Middlesex match at the Artillery Ground on 13 September 1732. London, batting last, needed seven more runs to win with six wickets standing when a Middlesex player tried to terminate the game as a draw by claiming time was up. According to the scorer's watch, there were still several minutes to go. The newspaper report said that the London players intended legal action as over £100 was at stake.

There were two controversies in 1734 around non-appearance by one of the teams. London and Sevenoaks were due to meet at Kennington Common on 8 July but Sevenoaks did not turn up and were obliged to forfeit their deposit. In September, London issued a challenge "to play with any eleven men in England, with this exception only, that they will not admit of one from Croydon". There was a dispute between the London and Croydon clubs after the latter failed to appear for an arranged match. It is not known if the challenge match was played.

Other events
 Section for collection of miscellaneous information from season articles being merged into this history

1726–1735
There was an increasing use of county names in the 1720s. Teams called Kent and Surrey had been recorded as far back as 1709, though they were probably not representative of the whole counties. In August 1726, a combined London and Surrey team hosted Edwin Stead's Kent XI on Kennington Common. In 1728, a Middlesex team played London and then, in 1729, there was the first known use of Hampshire and Sussex in a team title, albeit not individually. In 1730, the first match took place between teams titled Surrey and Middlesex.

In June 1728, the Swiss traveller César-François de Saussure noted in his journal the frequency with which he saw cricket being played while he was making his journeys across southern England. He referred to county matches as "a commonplace" and wrote that "everyone plays it, the common people and also men of rank". If they were a commonplace, they were also keenly contested to the point where winning teams would proclaim their county's superiority. In August of the same year, a game at Penshurst Park (near Tonbridge) between Kent and Sussex was won by Kent. The teams were organised by Edwin Stead (Kent) and Sir William Gage (Sussex). Stead's team had earlier won two games against the 2nd Duke of Richmond's XI (also representing Sussex) and their victory over Gage's XI was reported as "the third time this summer that the Kent men have been too expert for those of Sussex". In August 1729, there was a return match, again at Penshurst Park, between Stead's XI and Gage's XI – alternatively titled Kent (Stead's XI) v Sussex, Surrey & Hampshire (Gage's XI). This was won by Gage's team, apparently by the earliest known innings victory. A match report singled out Thomas Waymark of Sussex for special praise, saying that he "turned the scale of victory, which for some years past has been generally on the Kentish side". Also in 1728, there was a match in Lewes (exact venue unknown) between the Duke of Richmond's XI and Sir William Gage's XI.

Records have been found of six eleven-a-side matches played in 1729 including the Stead v Gage return in August. London and Dartford played each other twice – Dartford won one but the result of the other is unknown. A Kent county team played in three matches: one against Sussex, one against Surrey and one against a combined Hampshire, Surrey and Sussex team. The earliest reference to cricket at the University of Oxford is dated 1673, and the sport was being played there in the summer of 1729 on the testimony of Dr Samuel Johnson who was then a student. This was mentioned in James Boswell's Life of Samuel Johnson.

Fifteen eleven-a-side matches were recorded in 1730 including ten which involved county teams. It is the first season from which details of more than a handful of matches have survived. The brief report of a match between Kent and London refers to the "Kentish champions (losing) their honours", but the context is unclear and there was no county championship until well over a century later.

Records of thirty eleven-a-side matches have been found for the 1731 season including one which ended in a riot (see Controversies section below). Twelve games were recorded in 1732, eleven involving London. A newspaper report in September stated that London played 13 matches in all and were unbeaten. This, however, is contradicted by a report in May stating that Croydon defeated London "by great odds". In 1733, ten matches involved London and/or a county team. Records have been found of seven matches in 1734, mostly involving London and Kent who played each other twice. Of nine matches recorded in 1735, London played in seven.

1736–1740
In 1736, a total of 18 eleven-a-side games are on record with two single wicket ones. The earliest known tied match result occurred in one of the single wicket games when the teams, three of London and three of Surrey, aggregated 23 runs each. The other single wicket game was two London players, named as Wakeland and George Oldner, against an unnamed pair from Richmond who were "esteemed the best two in England". One of the Richmond players suffered a serious facial injury when hit by the ball.

Seven eleven-a-side games are known from 1737, all involving London. Some of the teams were sponsored by the Prince of Wales. There was crowd trouble at one match on Kennington Common between Kent and a combined London/Surrey team. Missiles were thrown and a man died a week later after being struck by a stone. The fixture was repeated twice in 1738 – Kent won one and the other is an unknown result. There are seven known matches in 1739 including the first to involve a team representing the Rest of England. It was billed as between "eleven gentlemen (of Kent) and eleven gentlemen from any part of England, exclusive of Kent". Kent won that game and a return match soon afterwards was drawn.

Generally agreed to be the "first modern representation of cricket", a series of engravings, The Game of Cricket, was made by Hubert-François Gravelot in 1739. The engravings were used on porcelain. Gravelot helped to establish the French Rococo style in English publishing and was one of the most celebrated illustrators of the time.

The earliest known mention of Slindon Cricket Club is in a letter dated 30 July 1740 from the Duke of Richmond to Thomas Pelham-Holles, 1st Duke of Newcastle, a future prime minister. Eight matches are on record in 1740, all involving London.

1741–1743

1744

1745–1747

1748–1750

References

Select bibliography
 
 
 
 
 
 
 
 
 
 
 
 
 
 
 

1726
1720s in sports
1730s in sports
1740s in sports
1750s in sports